The year 2010 in architecture involved some significant architectural events and new buildings.

Events
 12 May – Stephen T. Ayers becomes the 11th Architect of the Capitol.
 June – Broadcasting Tower, Leeds, by Feilden Clegg Bradley Studios, is the recipient of the 2010 Best Tall Building in the World award by the Council on Tall Buildings and Urban Habitat.
 November – The third World Architecture Festival is held in Barcelona.

Buildings and structures

Buildings

 4 January – Burj Khalifa (originally known as Burj Dubai) opens in the United Arab Emirates as the tallest man-made structure in the world (2010–present), at 828 m (2,717 ft).
 6 February – New building of Tampa Museum of Art in Tampa, Florida, designed by Stanley Saitowitz, opens to the public.
 27 April – Marina Bay Sands resort, Singapore, designed by Moshe Safdie, has a soft opening.
 12 May – Centre Pompidou-Metz, designed by Shigeru Ban, is inaugurated.
 May – MAXXI – National Museum of the 21st Century Arts in Rome, designed by Zaha Hadid, opens to the public. It wins this year's Stirling Prize.
 June – Strata SE1, residential apartments with integral wind turbines, designed by BFLS, completed in the London Borough of Southwark.
 September – Evelyn Grace Academy, a London school designed by Zaha Hadid, opens. It wins the 2011 Stirling Prize.
 October – Maggie's, a drop-in cancer care centre in Cheltenham, England, designed by Sir Richard MacCormac's MJP Architects, opens.
 28 October – Brian C. Nevin Welcome Center at Cornell Botanic Gardens in Ithaca, New York, designed by Baird Sampson Neuert of Toronto, dedicated.
 10 November – Sagrada Família in Barcelona, designed by Antoni Gaudí (d. 1926), is dedicated as a basilica and expiatory church following completion of the vault.
 12 November – Canton Tower opens for the 2010 Asian Games.
 December – Sainsbury Laboratory Cambridge University, designed by Stanton Williams, completed. It wins the 2012 Stirling Prize.
 Guangzhou International Finance Center in China, by Wilkinson Eyre Architects; it later wins the 2012 Lubetkin Prize.
 International Commerce Centre opens as the tallest building in Hong Kong.
 Centennial Place (Calgary) in Calgary, Alberta.
 Kaufhaus Tyrol department store in Innsbruck, designed by David Chipperfield with Dieter Mathoi, opens.
 Dybkær Church, Silkeborg, Denmark, designed by Regnbuen Arkitekter.
 More than 70 exposition pavilions are completed for the Expo 2010 in Shanghai, China.

Awards
 AIA Gold Medal – Peter Q. Bohlin (United States).
 Architecture Firm Award – Pugh + Scarpa
 Carbuncle Cup – Strata SE1
 Driehaus Architecture Prize for New Classical Architecture – Rafael Manzano Martos
 Grand Prix de l'urbanisme – Laurent Théry
 Lawrence Israel Prize – Lewis.Tsurumaki.Lewis
 LEAF Award, Overall Winner – Boogertman + Partners + Populous
 Praemium Imperiale Architecture Award – Toyo Ito
 Pritzker Architecture Prize – Kazuyo Sejima and Ryue Nishizawa (SANAA)
 RAIA Gold Medal – Kerry Clare and Lindsay Clare
 RIBA Royal Gold Medal – I. M. Pei
 Stirling Prize – Zaha Hadid
 Thomas Jefferson Medal in Architecture – Edward O. Wilson
 Vincent Scully Prize – Adele Chatfield-Taylor
 Twenty-five Year Award – The Hajj Terminal at King Abdulaziz International Airport

Deaths
 25 February – Frank Williams, 73, US skyscraper architect (b. 1936)
 4 March – Raimund Abraham, 77, Austrian architect (b. 1933)
 14 March – Der Scutt, 75, American architect (b. 1934)
 13 September – John Elliott, 73, British architect (b. 1936)

See also
Timeline of architecture

References

 
21st-century architecture